John Bower or Bowyer (fl. 1563) was an English politician.

He was a Member (MP) of the Parliament of England for Penryn in 1563.

References

Year of birth missing
Year of death missing
Members of the pre-1707 English Parliament for constituencies in Cornwall
English MPs 1563–1567